Marie-Claude Savard-Gagnon (born July 12, 1972) is a Canadian former pair skater. With Luc Bradet, she won the gold medal at the 1997 Canadian Figure Skating Championships and competed at the 1998 Winter Olympics.
Marie-Claude Savard-Gagnon and her partner, Luc Bradet were the first Pair Skaters to attempt the Quad Throw Salchow at the 1991 Nation's Cup in Gelsenkirshen, Germany.

Results
(with Bradet)

References

1972 births
Canadian female pair skaters
Figure skaters at the 1998 Winter Olympics
French Quebecers
Living people
Olympic figure skaters of Canada
Sportspeople from Quebec City